"Revolution Earth" is the fourth single released by the B-52's from their 1992 album Good Stuff.

The song's music video was directed by James Herbert. The single contains remixes of the song by Moby.

Song information
The song is an upbeat, folk influenced song, a radical stylistic departure for the B-52's.  Featuring Kate Pierson on lead vocals, "Revolution Earth" remains a fan favourite despite the fact that it is from an album featuring only three of the original five members of the band. With founding member Cindy Wilson absent from the recording, Pierson sings in harmony with herself - multi-tracking different vocal lines. Fred Schneider sings a brief backing vocal. As with many of the tracks from the Good Stuff album, "Revolution Earth" has a long and resounding intro and outro, as opposed to the band's earlier songs which always had a definite beginning and ending.

"Revolution Earth" was regularly featured in the B-52's live shows from 1992 up until about 2002, and then again from 2015. When Cindy Wilson rejoined the band in 1996, she sang backing vocals during live performances of the song. Live performances of the song from 2000 until 2002 were based on the CO2 Mix, one of several remixes created by Moby, couched in a faster rhythm and featured Sara Lee (then bass player for the band) on backing vocals, along with Wilson.

"Revolution Earth" is one of many songs with lyrics co-written with Robert Waldrop, a friend of the band.

The song was also covered on the Whirligig album Spin and featured Terre Roche.

References

1992 songs
The B-52's songs
Song recordings produced by Don Was
Songs written by Kate Pierson
Songs written by Keith Strickland
Reprise Records singles
1993 singles